William Edward Cousins (August 20, 1902 – September 14, 1988) was an American prelate of the Catholic Church. He served as an auxiliary bishop of the Archdiocese of Chicago in Illinois (1948 - 1952), as bishop of the Diocese of Peoria in Illinois (1952-1958) and as archbishop of the Archdiocese of Milwaukee in Wisconsin (1958-1977).

Biography

Early life 
William Cousins was born on August 20, 1902, in Chicago, Illinois.  He studied at Archbishop Quigley Preparatory Seminary in Chicago and was a member of the first graduating class of St. Mary of the Lake Seminary in Mundelein, Illinois.

Cousins was ordained to the priesthood for the Archdiocese of Chicago by Cardinal George Mundelein on April 27, 1927.Following his ordination, Cousins served as an assistant pastor at St. Bernard Parish for five years and then at Holy Name Cathedral Parris for a year. In 1933, he was appointed director of the Archdiocesan Mission Band, a group of priests who conducted missions throughout Chicago. He became pastor of St. Columbanus Parish in 1946.

Auxiliary Bishop of Chicago 
On December 17, 1948, Cousins was appointed auxiliary bishop of the Archdiocese of  Chicago and titular bishop of Forma by Pope Pius XII. He received his episcopal consecration on March 7, 1949, from Cardinal Samuel Stritch, with Bishops John Boylan and Albert Zuroweste serving as co-consecrators.

Bishop of Peoria 
Pius XII appointed Cousins as the fourth bishop of the Diocese of Peoria on May 21, 1952. He was installed at St. Mary's Cathedral in Peoria on July 2, 1952. During his tenure as bishop, Cousins established five new parishes and six new grade schools.

Archbishop of Milwaukee
Cousins was appointed as the eighth archbishop of the Archdiocese of Milwaukee by Pope John XXIII on December 18, 1958. From 1962 to 1965, Cousins attended the Second Vatican Council in Rome, during which he sat on the Commission on Communications Media and on the Lay Apostolate.

During the civil rights movement, Cousins was pressured to respond to the activities of his priests, particularly Reverend James Groppi, who led many civil rights marches and protests. In 1967, in response to many Milwaukee Catholics' dissatisfaction with Groppi, the Archbishop stated his support for open housing and Groppi's other objectives, but rejected the priest's tactics.

Retirement and legacy 
On September 17, 1977, Pope Paul VI accepted Cousins' resignation as archbishop of the Archdiocese of Milwaukee. William Cousins died in Milwaukee on September 14, 1988, at age 86.

In recent years, allegations have surfaced that Cousins was involved in the cover-up of child sexual abuse cases in the Milwaukee diocese. One notable case was that of Reverend Lawrence Murphy, whom Cousins allowed to relocate to the Diocese of Superior in 1974 after he received reports that Murphy sexually abused children.

In March 2019, the archdiocese announced that it was removing Cousins' name from its buildings and institutions. On March 22, 2019, the Archbishop Cousins Catholic Center was renamed the Mary Mother of the Church Pastoral Center.

See also

 Catholic Church in the United States
 Historical list of the Catholic bishops of the United States
 List of Catholic bishops of the United States
 Lists of patriarchs, archbishops, and bishops

References

External links
 Official site of the Holy See

1902 births
1988 deaths
20th-century Roman Catholic archbishops in the United States
Participants in the Second Vatican Council
People from Chicago
Roman Catholic Archdiocese of Chicago
Roman Catholic archbishops of Milwaukee
Roman Catholic bishops of Peoria
University of Saint Mary of the Lake alumni
Religious leaders from Illinois